The Riverton Houses is a large (originally 1,232 unit) residential development in Harlem, Manhattan, New York City.

Ownership
The project was proposed by the Metropolitan Life Insurance Company in 1944, and largely served an African American population, in contrast to Met Life's Parkchester in the Bronx (1940), Stuyvesant Town–Peter Cooper Village in Manhattan, Park La Brea in Los Angeles, Parkmerced in San Francisco, and Parkfairfax in Alexandria, Virginia, which were restricted to a whites-only tenancy at the time of their construction. The development consists of seven 13-story buildings situated on a  site located between 135th Street and 138th Street, and Fifth Avenue and the Harlem River. Some of the units on upper floors had views into the Polo Grounds.

In August 2008, Laurence Gluck's Stellar Management LLC notified its mortgage servicer that it anticipated defaulting on the property's $225 million mortgage within a month, since it was unable to convert half of the property's 1,230 rent-stabilized apartments to market rate; Stellar had owned the property from 2005. CWCapital won control of the complex in an auction held March 11, 2010, and began operating it through Rose Associates Inc. As of mid-2013, Riverton Houses was managed by CompassRock Real Estate. A&E Real Estate Holdings purchased the development for $201 million in 2016.

Notable residents
New York State Assemblyman Keith L. T. Wright (current as of April 2008)
Mayor David Dinkins (former)
Jazz pianist Billy Taylor

See also

 MetLife
 Co-op City, Bronx
 Cooperative Village
 LeFrak City
 Mitchell Lama
 Marcus Garvey Village
 Parkchester, Bronx
 Parkfairfax, Virginia
 Parkmerced, San Francisco
 Park La Brea, Los Angeles
 Penn South
 Rochdale Village, Queens
 Southbridge Towers
 Starrett City, Brooklyn
 Stuyvesant Town–Peter Cooper Village

References

External links

Riverton Houses
2005 purchase
Riverton Historical Group
Riverton Square

Residential buildings in Manhattan
Harlem